The 2005 Canadian Paralympic Athletics Championships was a disabled athletics competition that took place in Regina, Saskatchewan, Canada in 2005.

Wheelchair Racing

100 m T-34 (Women's)
GOLD: Chelsea Clark, Mississauga, Ontario

100 m T-52 (Women's)
GOLD: Lisa Franks, Saskatoon, Saskatchewan

100 m T-53 (Men's)
GOLD: Brent Lakatos, Dorval, Quebec: 16.20 sec

100 m T-54 (Men's)
GOLD: Daniel Normandin, Montreal: 15.87 sec

100 m T-54 (Women's)
GOLD: Chantal Petitclerc, Montreal: 18.11 sec

5000 m T-54 (Men's)
GOLD: Jeff Adams, Toronto: 12:14.12
SILVER: Michel Filteau, St-Jean-Baptiste, Quebec: 12:18.44

Track and field

Javelin throw
GOLD: France Gagné, Quebec City: 50.13 m

See also
 Canadian Paralympic Athletics Championships

Canadian Paralympics
Canadian Paralympic Athletics Championships
Canadian Paralympic Athletics Championships